The Göteborg Masters was a women's professional golf tournament on the Ladies European Tour that took place in Sweden. 

The tournament was first played 2008 and meant to be a recurring annual event, but the 2009 tournament was cancelled due to financial difficulties and it never returned to the LET schedule.

Gwladys Nocera won after scoring 259 (−29) following rounds of 66-62-65-66, the best 72-hole score in the LET's 30-year history.

Nina Reis was the runner-up with 270 (−18), shooting 69-67-73-61. The 11-under-par 61 tied the record for the LET's all time lowest round set by Kirsty Taylor at the 2005 Wales Ladies Championship of Europe. After 17 holes, Reis was at (−12) for the day and a score of 59 looked possible, but she bogeyed the last hole to drop back to a (−18) 270 for second place, her career best finish on the LET.

Winners

References

External links
Ladies European Tour

Former Ladies European Tour events
Golf tournaments in Sweden
Recurring sporting events established in 2008